The 2003 UEFA Champions League final was a football match that took place at Old Trafford in Manchester, England on 28 May 2003 to decide the winner of the 2002–03 UEFA Champions League. The match was contested by two Italian teams: Juventus and Milan. The match made history as it was the first time two clubs from Italy had faced each other in the final. It was also the second intra-national final of the competition, following the all-Spanish 2000 UEFA Champions League final between Real Madrid and Valencia three years earlier. Milan won the match via a penalty shoot-out after the game had finished 0–0 after extra time. It gave Milan their sixth success in the European Cup.

Background
Juventus entered the 2002–03 UEFA Champions League as 2001–02 Serie A champions and so qualified for the group phase, Milan finished fourth so started off in the third qualifying round.

Juventus went into the Champions League final as champions of Italy for the 27th time. Milan came third in the league, finishing with eleven fewer points than Juventus, but would win the 2002–03 Coppa Italia. The league games between the two teams in 2002–03 had each side winning their home fixture 2–1.

Route to the final

Milan
Milan won Group G of the first group round, a group that also included Bayern Munich, Lens and Deportivo La Coruña, advancing to the second group round where they won Group C. They defeated Real Madrid, Borussia Dortmund and Lokomotiv Moscow. They lost only two matches (Dortmund 1–0, and Real Madrid 3–1), and advanced to the quarter-finals where they met Ajax. The first leg was a draw (0–0) so the decisive match was the one at the San Siro which Milan won (3–2). In the semi-finals, they met local rivals Inter Milan. Both matches finished equal (0–0; 1–1), but Milan advanced on the away goals rule, despite both teams technically playing at home.

Juventus
Juventus won Group E of the first group round, in which the other teams were Newcastle United, Dynamo Kyiv and Feyenoord. They finished second in Group D of the second group round, after Manchester United, due to their losses against the English side (2–1; 3–0) and against Basel (2–1), but they qualified to the quarter-finals where they eliminated Barcelona in extra-time (1–1; 2–1). In the semi-final, Juventus met Real Madrid; they lost the first match (2–1), but they won the second (3–1), key midfielder Pavel Nedved picked up a second yellow card which meant he was suspended for the final.

Pre-match

Venue

Old Trafford, the home of Manchester United, was selected to host the match in December 2001, following a meeting of the UEFA Executive Committee in Nyon, Switzerland, at the same time as Estadio de La Cartuja in Seville was selected to host the 2003 UEFA Cup Final. It was selected ahead of the likes of the Santiago Bernabeu Stadium in Madrid, the Stade de France in Saint-Denis near Paris, and the Amsterdam Arena.

It would be the first time the stadium had hosted a major European final, although it had been the venue for both the two-legged 1968 Intercontinental Cup between Manchester United and Argentine club Estudiantes de La Plata, and the 1991 European Super Cup between Manchester United and Yugoslavian club Red Star Belgrade, which had been scheduled to be played over two legs, only for the Yugoslavian leg to be cancelled due to the wars in the country at the time.

The stadium had recently undergone a major expansion; following the mandatory conversion to an all-seater venue as a result of the Taylor Report and ahead of England hosting UEFA Euro 1996, the stadium's North Stand was expanded to three tiers, with a capacity of 25,500 spectators. This was followed by the addition of second tiers to the East and West Stands, which brought the overall capacity of the stadium to 68,217.

As has taken place for every Champions League final since 1997, a ceremonial handover of the European Champion Clubs' Cup from the holders to the host city took place on 3 April 2003. After receiving the trophy from a representative of holders Real Madrid in the ceremony at the Manchester Town Hall, UEFA Chief Executive Gerhard Aigner presented it to the Lord Mayor of Manchester, Roy Walters. Former Real Madrid players Alfredo Di Stéfano, Francisco Gento, Amancio and Emilio Butragueño, as were Manchester United manager Alex Ferguson, members of the club's 1968 European Cup final team, and members of Liverpool and Manchester City's past European trophy-winning teams.

Also in April 2003, a 24-hour football match – named the "Starball Match" in reference to the logo of the UEFA Champions League – was played in Manchester's Albert Square. It was the second Starball Match, after the inaugural match was held in Glasgow ahead of the 2002 UEFA Champions League final at Hampden Park. Over 1,000 players participated in the match, playing for sides named "Internazionale Manchester" and "Real Mancunian", in reference to Italian club Inter Milan and Spanish club Real Madrid. Internazionale Manchester won the match 252–162.

Match

Summary

After a brisk start, Milan had an Andriy Shevchenko goal ruled out after Rui Costa was deemed to have blocked Gianluigi Buffon's line of view from an offside position, although television replays showed that the Portuguese had moved out of Buffon's line of sight before the shot. Antonio Conte nearly scored for Juventus after coming on as a substitute in the second half, his header clattering against the post with Dida beaten. Andrea Pirlo also hit the bar for Milan. In the second half, both teams began to sit back and created few chances.

Both Juventus and Milan had injuries to defenders, Juventus' Igor Tudor leaving early in the first half after pulling a muscle in his right thigh. In extra time, Roque Júnior limped out due to fatigue and injury; as they had made all three of their allowed substitutions, they had to play the rest of the game with 10 men.

The penalty shoot-out has caused controversy among some fans as replays showed that Dida was in front of the goal line when saving penalties from David Trezeguet, Marcelo Zalayeta and Paolo Montero. Buffon was also off his line when saving penalties from Clarence Seedorf and Kakha Kaladze. Shevchenko put away the final penalty to win the European Cup for Milan for the sixth time.

Details

Statistics

Post-match
The teams would again meet in a feature final several months later in the 2003 Supercoppa Italiana in the United States. The game again required penalties to determine the winners, this time, however, Juventus came out on top.

See also
2002–03 UEFA Champions League
A.C. Milan in European football
Italian football clubs in international competitions
Juventus F.C.–A.C. Milan rivalry
Juventus F.C. in European football

References

External links
https://web.archive.org/web/20030608221319/http://www.uefa.com/competitions/UCL/Final2003/FixturesResults/Round%3D1640/Match%3D1045288/index.html Official Site] (Archived)

Final
European Cup Final 2003
European Cup Final 2003
European Cup Final 2003
UEFA Champions League finals
European Cup Final 2003
European Cup Final 2003
Final
Champ
May 2003 sports events in Europe
2000s in Manchester
International sports competitions in Manchester